Andy Thomson (born 28 March 1974) is an English former professional footballer who played as a defender for Swindon Town, Portsmouth, Bristol Rovers and Wycombe Wanderers.

Thomson's career began at his home town club, Swindon Town, as a trainee where he progressed to the first team and made 22 league appearances without scoring a goal. He moved to Portsmouth for a fee of £75,000 in 1995 and went on to make 93 appearances for Pompey, before the club's financial problems forced his sale to Bristol Rovers for a fee of £50,000 in 1999. During his time at Rovers, Thomson became the club captain and made 127 league appearances, scoring six goals in the process. He ended his league career at Wycombe Wanderers, where he spent two years and played 50 league games.

External links

Living people
1974 births
Sportspeople from Swindon
Association football defenders
English footballers
Swindon Town F.C. players
Portsmouth F.C. players
Bristol Rovers F.C. players
Wycombe Wanderers F.C. players
Forest Green Rovers F.C. players
Premier League players
English Football League players
National League (English football) players